Geoff Travis (born 2 February 1952) is the founder of both Rough Trade Records and the Rough Trade chain of record shops. A former drama teacher and owner of a punk record shop, Travis founded the Rough Trade label in 1978.

Biography
Travis was born on 2 February 1952 in Stoke Newington, London, and was raised in Finchley. He is Jewish, his ancestors emigrated from Romania and Ukraine. Travis studied English at Churchill College, Cambridge. He worked as a drama teacher before opening the original Rough Trade record shop in Kensington Park Road, Notting Hill, London on 23 February 1976, setting up the record label two years later. He claimed that he chose the location because it was close to Powis Square, where Performance, one of his favourite films, was made. Travis was also instrumental in the foundation of the independent distribution network The Cartel. While Rough Trade was a key independent label, Travis also co-ran labels with major record companies, including Blanco y Negro in 1983 (with WEA) and Trade2 (with Island Records).

Rough Trade was home to The Smiths, but by 1986, after three years on the label, the band were in dispute over finances. The song "Frankly Mr Shankly" from The Queen is Dead was reportedly a jibe at Travis.
The label was wound up in 1994 after briefly being revived in partnership with One Little Indian, but revived by Travis in 2001 with breakthrough acts The Strokes and The Libertines.

Writer Douglas Wolk credited Travis as virtually defining "the British post-punk sound", and XFM viewed his impact on independent music as greater than anyone else's in the country.

Jamie Travis
Geoff Travis has a son called Jamie, who is one half of the post-rave pop duo Babeheaven with singer Nancy Andersen.

References

External links
Interview with Furious in Nov. 1996
Several interviews with Travis explaining his ideals are included in this 1979 TV documentary

British Jews
British music industry executives
British people of Romanian-Jewish descent
British people of Ukrainian-Jewish descent
Living people
1952 births
Alumni of Churchill College, Cambridge
People from Stoke Newington
People educated at Dame Alice Owen's School